Lee June-hyoung (Hangul:이준형) (born October 28, 1996) is a South Korean former competitive figure skater. He is the 2014 JGP France champion and a three-time South Korean national champion (2013, 2015, 2016). He is the first South Korean male figure skater who stood on the podium and won gold at ISU events. Also, he is the first Korean male skater to qualify for the ISU Junior Grand Prix Final.

Personal life 
Lee June-hyoung was born in Seoul, South Korea. His mother, Oh Ji Youn, is a figure skating coach.

Career

Early years 
Lee was coached by his mother from the age of seven to 14. He started working with Chi Hyun-jung as his coach in 2010. Lee placed 3rd at both the Korean Junior Grand Prix qualification trials and the Korean Nationals.

2011–2012 season 
The 2011–2012 season was Lee's breakthout season. He included five different triple jumps in his program and improved jump consistency. In August, he was selected to represent Team Korea by placing second at the Korean Junior Grand Prix qualification trials. At the Asian Trophy, he took silver in the junior category.

Making his Junior Grand Prix (JGP) debut, Lee placed 4th at the 2011 JGP event in Latvia. At his second assignment, in Milan, Italy, he won bronze and became the first South Korean male figure skater to medal at an ISU event. He won the Korean Ranking competition in November and placed 4th at the Winter Youth Olympics. He placed 18th at the World Junior Championships.

2012–2013 season 
Lee started his season with a new free program, "Queen medley", but returned to his previous season's free program, "The Barber of Seville", at his first Junior Grand Prix event. He won South Korean Nationals, but could not compete at the senior World Championships because he did not meet the minimum technical score requirement for the event. He placed 13th at the World Junior Championships. In February, he landed a triple Axel jump during the short program segment at the Four Continents Championships.

2013–2014 season 
In the middle of the season, he changed his free skating from "The Planets" to "The Phantom of the Opera", which was shown at the Korean Nationals. At the nationals, with total score of 206.88, Lee became the first Korean male skater who scored over 200 points in domestic competitions. In February, he placed 14th at the 2013 Four Continents Figure Skating Championships in Taipei. In March, he placed 16th at the World Junior Championships in Sofia, Bulgaria.

2014–2015 season 
Competing in the 2014–15 JGP series, Lee won gold at his first event, JGP France, with overall score of 203.81. This accomplishment made him the first South Korean male figure skater to win an ISU event. By obtaining bronze at JGP Croatia, he became the first Korean male skater to qualify for an ISU Junior Grand Prix Final. In December, at the ISU Junior Grand Prix Final in Barcelona, Spain, he placed fifth in the short program and sixth in the free skating to place sixth place overall.

In January, Lee beat his rival, Kim Jin-seo, to win his second national title. He was nominated to the South Korean team for the 2015 Four Continents Championship. At the competition, he placed fifteenth in the short program and nineteenth in the free skate to place eighteenth overall. He placed 19th at the 2015 World Championships.

2015–2016 season 
During the summer, Lee was involved in a traffic accident as a passenger. A car driven by his mother was struck from behind by another car. After this incident, Lee started having back problems.

Lee opened the 2015–16 figure skating season by placing 10th at the 2015 Finlandia Trophy. He participated in the 2015 Skate Canada International with his new coach Shin Hea-Sook and placed 12th.

During the later half of the season, he placed sixteenth at the 2016 Four Continents Championship and placed 24th at the 2016 World Championships.

2016–2017 season 
Lee was still troubled by injuries during this season. He finished 16th at the 2017 Winter Universiade in Almaty, 18th at the 2017 Four Continents Championship in Gangneung, and 13th at the 2017 Asian Winter Games in Sapporo.

2017–2018 season 
Lee started his international season by placing 7th at the Philadelphia Summer International. He placed 5th at the 2017 CS Nebelhorn Trophy, qualifying a ticket for South Korea in the men's singles category for the 2018 Winter Olympics, with a new set of personal best results.

Retirement 
Due to the COVID-19 pandemic, Lee could not participate in skating events during the 2020–2021 season. At the end of the season, he started a new career in musical theatre.

Programs

Competitive highlights 
GP: Grand Prix; CS: Challenger Series; JGP: Junior Grand Prix

2011–2012 to present

2006–2007 to 2010–2011: Pre-international debut

Detailed results

Senior level

Junior level 

 ISU personal bests highlighted in Bold.

References

External links 

 
  

South Korean male single skaters
1996 births
Living people
Figure skaters from Seoul
Figure skaters at the 2017 Asian Winter Games
Figure skaters at the 2012 Winter Youth Olympics
Competitors at the 2017 Winter Universiade
Competitors at the 2019 Winter Universiade